Ernstthal am Rennsteig is a municipality section of the so-called Glass-blower Town (de: Glasbläserstadt) Lauscha in the district of Sonneberg in Thuringia, Germany, close to the Thuringian Rennsteig.

Geography 
Close to the Ernstthal Station and the Rennsteig rises the river Kieselbach one of the tributaries of the Lichte river.

History

Heraldry

Politics

Municipal council

Culture

Places of interest

Annual events and recreational activities

Economy and infrastructure

Local enterprises

Infrastructure

Famous people 
 Karl Böhm-Hennes, a successful skier (1891–1914)
 Wally Eichhorn-Nelson, an author
 Baldur Schönfelder, an artist who made paintings of the "Rennsteig"

External links 
Mondstürer-Gemeinde

Former municipalities in Thuringia
Sonneberg (district)